Skulduggery Pleasant: Kingdom of the Wicked is young adult and fantasy novel written by Irish playwright Derek Landy, published in July 2012. It is the seventh of the Skulduggery Pleasant series and sequel to Skulduggery Pleasant: Death Bringer. The story follows the sorcerer and detectives Valkyrie Cain and Skulduggery Pleasant as they investigate normal people suddenly developing magical powers after being infected by a rare strain of magic. The book would not see release in the US and Canada until 2018. HarperCollins Audio also publishes the unabridged CD sets of the books read by Rupert Degas.

Plot summary
Sanctuary detectives Skulduggery Pleasant and Valkyrie Cain are tasked with tracking down a group of people who have mysteriously gained magical powers. One of them tells Pleasant that he was given the powers in a dream, by a man called Argeddion.

Pleasant and Cain discover that Argeddion used to be a pacifist called Walden D'Essai, who disappeared after discovering his True Name was Argeddion. They find that D'Essai was handed over to detective Tyren Lament, who was tasked with making sure that Argeddion never used his power. They find Silas Nadir, a serial killer connected to Lament, who gives them names of Lament's group. Valkyrie starts to feel her arm hurt in the place Silas Nadir grabbed her. She is then 'shunted' into another dimension, where she meets Alexander Remit, a Teleporter who mentions that Mevolent rules this dimension. 

Pleasant realises that Lament and his group are guarding Argeddion so that he doesn't use his powers. Pleasant and Cain set off for the Alps after learning that Tyren Lament and his team had some cargo delivered there. They find Lament, who agrees to let them see Argeddion.They go to the prison where Argeddion is incarcerated, called the Cube.

Doran, Kitana, Sean and Elsie go to Doran's house and find his older brother, Tommy, who Doran kills. Seeing that their immense power is causing them to become murderous, Elsie leaves the others. Valkyrie and Geoffrey Scrutinous question Doran about the murder and Valkyrie suspects he is involved with Tommy's death. When they follow Doran to a coffee shop, they are attacked by Kitana. They escape, but Kitana takes Valkyrie's jacket.

The Sanctuary develops a plan to acquire the Sceptre of the Ancients in order to erase Argeddion from existence. Upon his return, he decides to eliminate all his experimental magic users, as he observes their new murderous behaviour. During this time, Cain is shunted over into a parallel dimension, 'The Kingdom of The Wicked.' Cain and Pleasant enlist Nefarian Serpine to guide them to Mevolent's palace. With the help of Serpine, they rescue Cain's captured Reflection from the palace and escape with the Sceptre. 

Kitana kills Greta Dapple, weakening Argeddion's morale. The Sanctuary attacks him, rendering him temporarily unconscious, only for Kitana to reveal her true colors and turn on them. Cain and Pleasant take on the personas of Lord Vile and Darquesse to defeat her, but Darquesse gets shunted again afterward. Mevolent finds her and almost succeeds in killing her, but she escapes, returning to her own dimension. She kills Kitana, and once again goes head to head with Lord Vile. Pleasant returns to his senses and induces an epileptic shock in Darquesse, allowing Cain to return to her true self.

Back at the Sanctuary, the Grand Mage is released and agrees to a truce only to be killed later by Tanith Low before he can discuss the truce with his Sanctuary. Cain, Pleasant, and the Council of Elders prepare for the global scale unsanctioned war that is sure to follow.

Reception
Patrick Wan, writing in SF's Crow's Nest, complimented the skillful use of cliffhangers which made the book "almost impossible to put...down." 

In 2012, Kingdom of the Wicked was shortlisted for the Senior Irish Children's Book of the Year, losing to Artemis Fowl and the Last Guardian.

References

External links
Skulduggery Pleasant UK, Australia and New Zealand Official Website
Skulduggery Pleasant US and Canada Official Website

2012 children's books
2012 Irish novels
HarperCollins books
Irish fantasy novels
Skulduggery Pleasant books